Hughes  is an English language surname.

Origins 
Hughes is an Anglicized spelling of the Welsh and Irish patronymic surname. The surname may also derive from the etymologically unrelated Picard variant Hugh (Old French Hue) of the Germanic name Hugo.

In Wales and other areas of Brythonic Britain, the surname derives from the personal name "Hu" or "Huw", meaning "fire" or "inspiration". At the British Census of 1881, the relative frequency of the surname Hughes was highest on the Welsh island of Ynys Môn (Anglesey; 37.2 times the British average), followed by Gwynedd, Flintshire, Denbighshire, Meirionydd, Montgomeryshire, Ceredigion, Radnorshire and Carmarthenshire.

In Ireland, the surname evolved from the ancient Irish name of Ó hAodha, for a grandson/descendant of Aodh (meaning "fire"). Aodh was frequently Anglicized as Hugh, with Ó hAodha in turn being Anglicized as Hughes or Hayes. "Hughes" is often found in the northern Irish province of Ulster, being especially common in counties Armagh, Tyrone, Monaghan, Donegal and Fermanagh.  It was the 34th most common name in all of Ireland in Matheson's 1890 census of Ireland, and the 44th most common surname in Ireland in the 1992–1997 period.  In addition to the counties of Ulster, the surname Hughes is also commonly found in the counties Wexford, Galway and Cork.

People with the surname "Hughes" include

A
Aarika Hughes (born 1987), American basketball coach
Aaron Hughes (born 1979), Northern Irish footballer
Abel Hughes (1869–??), Welsh footballer
Adam Hughes (disambiguation), multiple people
Adella Prentiss Hughes (1869–1950), American pianist
Agnes Twiston Hughes (1895–1981), Welsh politician
Aidan Hughes (born 1956), British commercial artist
Akilah Hughes (born 1989), American comedian
Alan Hughes (disambiguation), multiple people
Albert Hughes (disambiguation), multiple people
Aleca Hughes (born 1990), American ice hockey player
Alexander Hughes (disambiguation), multiple people
Alfred Hughes (disambiguation), multiple people
Alfredrick Hughes (born 1962), American basketball player
Alice Hughes (1857–1939), English photographer
Ailsa Hughes (born 1991), Irish rugby union footballer
Alison Hughes (born 1971/1972), British tennis umpire
Alister Hughes (1919–2005), Grenadian journalist
Allen Hughes (1921–2009), American music critic
Amy Hughes (disambiguation), multiple people
Andrew Hughes (disambiguation), multiple people
Andy Hughes (1965–2009), British music producer
Aneurin Hughes (1937–2020), British diplomat
Angee Hughes (born 1955), American actress
Ann Hughes (disambiguation), multiple people
Anthony Hughes (disambiguation), multiple people
Archie Hughes (disambiguation), multiple people
Arthur Hughes (disambiguation), multiple people
Arwel Hughes (1909–1988), Welsh composer and conductor
Augusto Hughes (1931–1993), Argentine soldier

B
Babette Hughes (1905–1982), American playwright
Barnard Hughes (1915–2006), Irish-American actor
Barry Hughes (1937–2019), Welsh football player and manager
Barry B. Hughes (born 1945), American professor
Bela M. Hughes (1817–1903), American politician
Ben D. Hughes (1878–1947), American farmer and politician
Benji Hughes (born 1975), American musical artist
Beryl Hughes (1931–2017), Welsh chess master and writer
Bernard Hughes (1808–1878), Irish industrialist and politician
Bernie Hughes (1910–1967), American football player
Bettany Hughes (born 1968), English historian
Beverley Hughes (born 1950), British politician
Bill Hughes (disambiguation), multiple people
Billy Hughes (disambiguation), multiple people
Bradley Hughes (disambiguation), multiple people
Brandon Hughes (born 1986), American football player
Brandon Hughes (baseball) (born 1995), American baseball player
Brendan Hughes (1948–2008), Irish army officer
Brent Hughes (disambiguation), multiple people
Brewster Hughes (1912–1986), Nigerian guitarist
Brian Hughes (disambiguation), multiple people
Brigid Hughes, American editor
Bronwen Hughes (born 1967), Canadian film director

C
Cadwalader Hughes, English priest
Calvin Hughes, American news anchor
Cameron Hughes (disambiguation), multiple people
Caoilinn Hughes (born 1985), Irish novelist
Carl Hughes, British rugby league footballer
Carla Hughes (born 1981), American teacher and murderer
Carly Hughes, American actress
Carlye J. Hughes, American bishop
Carol Hughes (disambiguation), multiple people
Caspar Hughes (born 1993), English footballer
Catherine Hughes (disambiguation), multiple people
Cathy Hughes (born 1947), American entrepreneur
Ceri Hughes (born 1971), Welsh footballer
Charles Hughes (disambiguation), multiple people
Charleston Hughes (born 1983), American football player
Charlotte Hughes (born 1954), American author
Chesney Hughes (born 1991), Anguillian cricketer
Chris Hughes (disambiguation), multiple people
Chrissy Hughes (born 1990), American figure skater
Christa Hughes, Australian singer
Christopher Hughes (disambiguation), multiple people
Chuck Hughes (1943–1971), American football player
Chuck Hughes (chef) (born 1976), Canadian chef
Clara Hughes (born 1972), Canadian cyclist and speed skater
Cledwyn Hughes (1916–2001), Welsh politician
Cleve Hughes (born 1987), Australian rules footballer
Clive Hughes (disambiguation), multiple people
Coleman Hughes (born 1996), American writer
Colin Hughes (disambiguation), multiple people
Collingwood Hughes (1872–1963), British politician
Connor Hughes (disambiguation), multiple people
Corey Hughes (born 1978), Australian rugby league footballer
Cornelius Jabez Hughes (1819–1884), British photographer
Curtis Hughes (born 1964), American professional wrestler
Cynthia Hughes (??–1989), Grenadian journalist

D
Dafydd Hughes (born 1996), Welsh rugby union footballer
Daisy Marguerite Hughes (1883–1968), American painter
Damien Hughes, Anguillan sports executive
Danan Hughes (born 1970), American football player
Daniel Hughes (disambiguation), multiple people
Dante Hughes (born 1985), American football player
Darren Hughes (disambiguation), multiple people
David Hughes (disambiguation), multiple people
Davis Hughes (1910–2003), Australian politician
Dean Hughes (born 1943), American author
Debbie Hughes (born 1958), American artist
Debby Hughes (born 1977), South African cricketer
Declan Hughes (disambiguation), multiple people
Deirdre Hughes (born 1973), Irish camogie player
Del Hughes (1909–1985), American stage manager
Dennis Hughes (disambiguation), multiple people
Denny Hughes (1894–1953), American football player
Des Hughes (born 1970), British artist
Desmond Hughes (1919–1992), Northern Irish Air Force officer
Dessie Hughes (1943–2014), Irish racehorse trainer
Detrick Hughes (born 1966), American poet
Dewey Hughes (born 1932), American radio personality
Don B. Hughes (born 1940), American politician
Donald J. Hughes (1915–1960), American nuclear physicist
Donna Hughes (disambiguation), multiple people
Dorothy Hughes (disambiguation), multiple people
Doug Hughes (born 1955), American theatre director
Doug Hughes (activist) (born 1953), American postal worker and activist 
Dudley Mays Hughes (1848–1927), American farmer and politician
Dusty Hughes (disambiguation), multiple people
Dylan Hughes (born 1985), Canadian-Welsh footballer

E
Ed Hughes (disambiguation), multiple people
Edan Milton Hughes (1935–2015), American art dealer
Eddie Hughes (disambiguation), multiple people
Edith Hughes (disambiguation), multiple people
Edna Hughes (1916–1990), English swimmer
Edward Hughes (disambiguation), multiple people
Edwin Hughes (disambiguation), multiple people
E. J. Hughes (1913–2007), Canadian painter
Eleanor Hughes (1882–1952), New Zealand artist
Elijah Hughes (born 1998), American basketball player
Elisha Hughes (born 1959), Antiguan cyclist
Elizabeth Hughes (disambiguation), multiple people
Ellen Hughes (1867–1927), Welsh writer and suffragist
Elwyn Hughes, Welsh author
Emily Hughes (born 1989), American figure skater
Emlyn Hughes (1947–2004), English footballer
Emma Hughes (born 2000), Australian cricketer
Emmet John Hughes (1920–1982), American editor
Emmett Hughes (born 1987), Irish actor and producer
Emrys Hughes (1894–1969), Welsh politician
Emrys Hughes (rugby league), Welsh rugby league footballer
Enoch Hughes (1829–1893), English ironworker
Eric Hughes (disambiguation), multiple people
Ernie Hughes (born 1955), American football player
Ethan Hughes (born 1994), Australian rules footballer
Eugene Hughes (disambiguation), multiple people
Eva Hughes (1856–1940), Australian political activist
Evan Hughes, American musician
Everett Hughes (disambiguation), multiple people

F
Finola Hughes (born 1959), English actress
Fiona Hughes (born 1990), English skier
Fiona Hughes (academic), British academic
Fountain Hughes (c. 1862–1957), American slave
Francine Hughes (1947–2017), American nurse
Francis Hughes (1956–1981), Irish soldier
Francis Wade Hughes (1817–1885), American lawyer and politician
Frank Hughes (disambiguation), multiple people
Freddie Hughes (1943–2022), American singer
Frederic Hughes (1858–1944), Australian general
Frederick Hughes (disambiguation), multiple people
Frieda Hughes (born 1960), English-Australian poet and artist
F. W. Hughes (1869–1950), Australian businessman

G
Gabbie Hughes (born 1999), American ice hockey player
Gabriel Hughes (born 2001), American baseball player
Gareth Hughes (disambiguation), multiple people
Garnet Hughes (1880–1937), Canadian military officer
Garry Hughes (born 1952), Australian rugby league footballer
Gary Hughes (disambiguation), multiple people
Genevieve Hughes (1932–2012), American activist
Geoffrey Hughes (disambiguation), multiple people
George Hughes (disambiguation), multiple people
Geraint Hughes (born 1934), English priest
Geraldine Hughes (born 1970), Northern Irish actress
Gerard W. Hughes (1924–2014), Scottish priest
Germain Hughes (born 1996), Anguillan footballer
Gerry Hughes (disambiguation), multiple people
Gertrude Reif Hughes (1936–2022), American professor
Gervase Hughes (1905–1984), English composer
Gethin Benwil Hughes, American bishop
Gilbert Hughes, Irish politician
Glen Hughes (born 1973), Australian rugby league footballer
Glenn Hughes (disambiguation), multiple people
Glyn Hughes (disambiguation), multiple people
Gomer Hughes (1910–1974), Welsh rugby union footballer
Gordon Hughes (born 1936), English footballer
Graeme Hughes (born 1955), Australian cricketer
Graham Hughes (disambiguation), multiple people
Gregg Hughes (born 1963), American broadcaster
Greg Hughes (disambiguation), multiple people
Griffith William Hughes (1861–1941), Welsh musician
Gwen Hughes (born 1963), American singer-songwriter
Gwyn Hughes (disambiguation), multiple people
Gwyneth Hughes, British screenwriter

H
Hamilton Hughes, Fijian rugby league footballer
Hank Hughes (1907–1963), American football player
Hanson Truman Hughes, American politician
Harley Hughes (1935–2022), American Air Force officer
Harold Hughes (1922–1996), American politician
Harrison Hughes (1881–1958), British businessman
Harry Hughes (disambiguation), multiple people
Hatcher Hughes (1881–1945), American playwright
Hector Hughes (1887–1970), Scottish politician
Helen Hughes (disambiguation), multiple people
Henry Hughes (disambiguation), multiple people
Herbert Hughes (disambiguation), multiple people
Hollie Hughes (disambiguation), multiple people
Holly Hughes (disambiguation), multiple people
Howard Hughes (disambiguation), multiple people
Howell Harris Hughes (1873–1956), Welsh theologian
Hubert Hughes (1933–2021), Anguillan politician
Hugh Hughes (disambiguation), multiple people
Hughes Hughes (1792–1874), British politician
Hughie Hughes (1885–1916), British race car driver

I
Iain Hughes (born 1950), British judge
Ian Hughes (disambiguation), multiple people
Ieuan Hughes, British professor
Iorwerth Hughes (1925–1993), Welsh footballer
Irene Hughes (1920–2012), American psychic
Isaac Hughes (1798–1870), English minister
Ivor Hughes (1897–1962), British army officer

J
Jabez Hughes (1685–1731), English translator
Jack Hughes (disambiguation), multiple people
Jackie Hughes (1923–??), Welsh boxer
Jahrome Hughes (born 1994), New Zealand rugby league footballer
Jake Hughes (born 1994), British racing driver
James Hughes (disambiguation), multiple people
Jamie Hughes (disambiguation), multiple people
Jana Hughes (born 1971), American politician
Jane Hughes (disambiguation), multiple people
Janis Hughes (born 1958), Scottish politician
Jaquelyne Hughes, Indigenous-Australian researcher
Jared Hughes (born 1985), American baseball player
Jarryd Hughes (born 1995), Australian snowboarder
Jason Hughes (disambiguation), multiple people
Jay Hughes (disambiguation), multiple people
Jayne Hughes, Manx judge
Jazmine Hughes (born 1991), American writer
Jed Hughes, American football coach
Jedd Hughes (born 1982), Australian singer-songwriter
Jeff Hughes (disambiguation), multiple people
Jefferson D. Hughes III, American judge
Jeffrey W. Hughes (born 1966), American naval admiral
Jerahl Hughes (born 1989), English footballer
Jerome M. Hughes (1929–2015), American politician
Jerry Hughes (born 1988), American football player
Jesse Hughes (disambiguation), multiple people
Jim Hughes (disambiguation), multiple people
Joan Hughes (1918–1993), British pilot
Joanna Hughes (born 1977), Australian gymnast
Joe Hughes (disambiguation), multiple people
John Hughes (disambiguation), multiple people
Jonathan Hughes (disambiguation), multiple people
Jordan Hughes (born 1984), Canadian soccer player
Joseph Hughes (disambiguation), multiple people
Josephine Brawley Hughes (1839–1926), American political advocate
Josh Hughes (born 1991), American soccer player
Joshua Hughes (disambiguation), multiple people
Josiah Charles Hughes (1843–1886), Canadian politician
Judge Hughes (1944–2013), American football player and coach
JuJu Hughes (born 1998), American football player
Jula Hughes, American academic administrator
Julia Pearl Hughes (1873–1950), American pharmacist
Justin Hughes (disambiguation), multiple people

K
Karen Hughes (born 1956), French-American diplomat
Kate Duval Hughes (1837–??), American author and inventor
Kath Hughes, Welsh actress and comedian
Katherine Hughes (disambiguation), multiple people
Kathleen Hughes (born 1928), American actress
Kathleen Hughes (historian) (1926–1977), English historian
Kay Hughes (1914–1998), American actress
Keith Hughes (disambiguation), multiple people
Kenmore Hughes (born 1970), Antiguan sprinter
Kenneth Hughes (disambiguation), multiple people
Kent Hughes (disambiguation), multiple people
Kerrie Hughes (born 1959), New Zealand fashion designer
Kevin Hughes (disambiguation), multiple people
Kim Hughes (disambiguation), multiple people
Kimberly Hughes, American biologist
Kirsten Hughes (disambiguation), multiple people
Kitanya Hughes (born 1982), Antiguan footballer
Kristen Hughes (born 1979), Australian netball player
Kyle Hughes (born 1989), British motorcycle speedway rider

L
Langston Hughes (1902–1967), American poet
Larry Hughes (born 1979), American basketball player
Larry Hughes (politician) (1931–2000), American politician
Laura Hughes (disambiguation), multiple people
Lauren E. Hughes, Australian carcinologist
Laurie Hughes (1924–2011), English footballer
Lawrence Hughes (disambiguation), multiple people
L. C. Hughes (1842–1915), American newspaper editor and lawyer
Lee Hughes (born 1976), English footballer
Len Hughes (1899–1958), English footballer
Lena Hughes (1904–1998), American musician
Lena B. Smithers Hughes (1905–1987), American botanist
Leon Hughes (born 1932), American singer
LeRoy Hughes (1905–1991), American football and basketball coach
Leslie Hughes (disambiguation), multiple people
Liam Hughes (disambiguation), multiple people
Linda Hughes (born 1950), Canadian newspaper publisher
Lindsey Hughes (1949–2007), British historian
Lisabeth Tabor Hughes (born 1955), American judge
Lloyd Hughes (disambiguation), multiple people
Lorna M. Hughes (born 1968), British professor
Louis R. Hughes (born 1949), American business executive
Luke Hughes (disambiguation), multiple people
Lynn Hughes (born 1941), American judge
Lynn Hughes (artist) (born 1951), Canadian artist

M
Mackenzie Hughes (born 1990), Canadian golfer
Mal Hughes (bowls) (1932–2008), English lawn bowler
Madison Hughes (born 1992), American rugby sevens player
Malcolm Hughes (1920–1997), British artist
Malcolm K. Hughes, British climatologist
Mallie Hughes (1921–1995), Canadian ice hockey player
Margaret Hughes (disambiguation), multiple people
Marion Hughes (born 1968), Irish equestrian
Marjorie Hughes (born 1925), American singer
Mark Hughes (disambiguation), multiple people
Mary Hughes (disambiguation), multiple people
Mathew Hughes (1822–1882), English Victoria Cross recipient
Matt Hughes (disambiguation), multiple people
Maxi Hughes (born 1990), British boxer
Meaghan Hughes (born 1986), Canadian curler
Medwin Hughes (born 1961), British academic administrator
Megan Hughes (born 1977), Welsh track cyclist
Meredydd Hughes (born 1958), British police officer
Merv Hughes (born 1961), Australian cricketer
Mervin Ray Hughes (born 1969), American serial killer
Michael Hughes (disambiguation), multiple people
Mickey Hughes (1866–1931), American baseball player
Miko Hughes (born 1986), American actor
Mildred Barry Hughes (1902–1995), American politician
Mimi Hughes, American swimmer
Miriam K. Hughes (born 1945), American ambassador
Moelwyn Hughes (1897–1955), Welsh lawyer and politician
Mollie Hughes (born 1990), British sports adventurer
Monica Hughes (1925–2003), English-Canadian author
Montori Hughes (born 1990), American football player
Morris N. Hughes Jr. (1945–2016), American ambassador
Myra Kathleen Hughes (1877–1918), Irish artist

N
Nancy Sanford Hughes (born 1943), American entrepreneur
Nate Hughes (born 1985), American football player
Nathan Hughes (born 1991), Fijian rugby league footballer
Neal Hughes (born 1980), Canadian football player
Ned Hughes (1881–1928), New Zealand rugby union footballer
Nerys Hughes (born 1941), Welsh actress
Neville Hughes (1945–2015), British actor
Nicholas Hughes (1962–2009), British biologist
Nicola Hughes (disambiguation), multiple people
Nina Hughes, British boxer
Noel Hughes (1928–2011), Australian-English cricketer
Norman Hughes (born 1952), English field hockey player

O
Obadiah Hughes (1695–1751), English minister
Oliver Hughes (disambiguation), multiple people
Omar Hughes (born 1982), Grenadian swimmer
Owain Arwel Hughes (born 1942), Welsh conductor
Owen Hughes (disambiguation), multiple people

P
Pádraig Hughes, Gaelic football referee
Pat Hughes (disambiguation), multiple people
Paterson Clarence Hughes (1917–1940), Australian fighter pilot
Patricia Hughes (disambiguation), multiple people
Patrick Hughes (disambiguation), multiple people
Paul Hughes (disambiguation), multiple people
Penny Hughes (born 1959), British businesswoman
Percy Hughes (disambiguation), multiple people
Peta Hughes (born 1987), Australian squash player
Pete Hughes (born 1968), American college baseball coach
Peter Hughes (disambiguation), multiple people
Philip Hughes (disambiguation), multiple people

Q
Quentin Hughes (disambiguation), multiple people
Quinn Hughes (born 1999), American ice hockey player

R
Ross Hughes (born 1948), American politician
Randy Hughes (born 1953), American football player
Raymond Hughes (disambiguation), multiple people
Regina Olson Hughes (1895–1993), American illustrator
Reginald Hughes, rugby league player
Renne Hughes (1941–1991), American painter
Revella Hughes (1895–1987), American musician
Rex Hughes (1938–2016), American basketball coach
Rhetta Hughes (1939–2019), American singer
Rhodri Hughes (born 1993), Welsh rugby union footballer
Rhonda Hughes (born 1947), American mathematician
Rhys Hughes (born 1966), Welsh writer
Rhys Hughes (footballer) (born 2001), Welsh footballer
Rian Hughes, British graphic designer
Richard Hughes (disambiguation), multiple people
R. Kent Hughes (born 1942), American pastor
Robert Hughes (disambiguation), multiple people
Robin Hughes (disambiguation), multiple people
Rochford Hughes (1914–1996), British Air Force officer
Rod Hughes (born 1954), Australian rules footballer
Roddy Hughes (1891–1970), Welsh actor
Rodney Hughes (1925–2005), American politician
Roger Hughes (disambiguation), multiple people
Ron Hughes (disambiguation), multiple people
Ronan Hughes (born 1998), Scottish footballer
Rowland Hughes (1896–1957), American politician
Roy Hughes (disambiguation), multiple people
Rupert Hughes (1872–1956), American novelist
Russell Hughes (disambiguation), multiple people
Ryan Hughes (disambiguation), multiple people

S
Sacha Hughes (born 1990), New Zealand sports executive
Sali Hughes (born 1975), Welsh journalist
Sam Hughes (disambiguation), multiple people
Samantha Hughes (disambiguation), multiple people
Sandra Hughes, American politician
Sara Hughes (born 1995), American beach volleyball player
Sara Hughes (artist) (born 1971), Canadian-New Zealand artist
Sarah Hughes (disambiguation), multiple people
Scarlett Hughes (born 2002), English cricketer
Scott Hughes (born 1952), American architect
Scottie Nell Hughes (born 1980), American journalist
Séamus Hughes (1952–2022), Irish politician
Seamus Hughes (trade unionist) (1881–1943), Irish trade unionist
Sean Hughes (disambiguation), multiple people
Selwyn Hughes (1928–2006), Welsh minister
Sergio Hughes (born 2004), West Indian footballer
Setareki Hughes (born 1995), Fijian footballer
Shara Hughes (born 1981), American painter
Shelby Hughes (1981–2014), American artist
Shirley Hughes (1927–2022), English author
Shona Powell Hughes (born 1991), Welsh rugby union footballer
Shorty Hughes (1922–2003), American football coach
Simon Hughes (disambiguation), multiple people
Solomon Hughes (disambiguation), multiple people
Sophie Hughes (born 1986), British translator
Spencer Hughes (disambiguation), multiple people
Spike Hughes (1908–1987), British musician
Stephen Hughes (disambiguation), multiple people
Stuart Hughes (disambiguation), multiple people
Sunni Hughes (born 1968), Australian footballer
Susan Hughes (born 1960), Canadian author

T
T. A. Hughes, American politician
Talbot Hughes (1869–1942), British painter
Tanya Hughes (born 1972), American high jumper
Ted Hughes (disambiguation), multiple people
Telly Hughes (born 1978), American television personality
Terry Hughes (disambiguation), multiple people
Thea Stanley Hughes (1907–1990), Australian writer
Thomas Hughes (disambiguation), multiple people
Tim Hughes (disambiguation), multiple people
Toby Hughes (born 1979), English cricketer
Todd Hughes (born 1963), American writer and film producer
Todd M. Hughes (born 1966), American attorney and judge
Tonda L. Hughes, American professor
Tony Hughes (disambiguation), multiple people
Travis Hughes (born 1978), American baseball player
Trévon Hughes (born 1987), American basketball player
Trevor Hughes (1925–2017), British civil servant
Trystan Owain Hughes (born 1972), English theologian
Tyler Hughes (born 1993), Canadian soccer player
Tyrone Hughes (born 1970), American football player

V
Van Hughes (born 1960), American football player
Vern Hughes (baseball) (1893–1961), American baseball player
Vernon W. Hughes (1921–2003), American physicist
Victoria Hughes (1897–1978), British lavatory attendant
Vincent Hughes (born 1956), American politician

W
W. A. Hughes (1816–1892), British colonist
Warren Hughes (born 1969), English racing driver
Wendy Hughes (1952–2014), Australian actress
Wilf Hughes (1910–1984), Welsh cricketer
Wilfrid Kent Hughes (1895–1970), Australian army officer
William Hughes (disambiguation), multiple people
Walter Hughes (disambiguation), multiple people
Wayne Hughes (footballer) (born 1958), Welsh footballer
Wayne Hughes (pastor), New Zealand minister
W. W. Hughes, American football coach

Z
Zacari Hughes (born 1971), Australian footballer
Zharnel Hughes (born 1995), British sprinter

References

External links
 'Ireland information Irish surnames'

See also
Hughes brothers, a pair of American film directors
Admiral Hughes (disambiguation), a disambiguation page with Admirals surnamed Hughes
Attorney General Hughes (disambiguation), a disambiguation page with Attorneys General surnamed Hughes
Governor Hughes (disambiguation), a disambiguation page with Governors surnamed Hughes
Justice Hughes (disambiguation), a disambiguation page with justices surnamed Hughes
Lord Hughes (disambiguation), a disambiguation page with Lords surnamed Hughes
Mr. Hughes (disambiguation), a disambiguation page with people nicknamed "Mr. Hughes"
Senator Hughes (disambiguation), a disambiguation page with Senators surnamed Hughes

English-language surnames
Welsh-language surnames
Surnames of French origin
Surnames of Welsh origin
Surnames of Irish origin
Patronymic surnames
Surnames from given names